Academic Sports Association (Polish: Akademicki Związek Sportowy, AZS) is a mass students’ sport organization, one of the biggest sports associations in Poland. Its main objectives are development of physical education, promotion of healthy lifestyle and physical activities among Polish youth.

Currently, AZS has around 50 000 members, students of around 200 colleges across Poland. Students, associated with the organization, can practice various kinds of sports as amateurs and as professionals. AZS sportspersons make up around 25% of members of Polish national teams, they are represented in all major sports events across the world, including the Olympic Games.

History

Early days
Akademicki Związek Sportowy was founded on 15 May 1909, during a meeting of students, which took place in Collegium Novum of the Jagiellonian University in Kraków. A student of medicine of the Jagiellonian University, Wacław Majewski, became first director of the association.

In the Second Polish Republic, AZS quickly developed into a mass organization, present in all Polish major urban areas. Number of its branches grew, and by 1939, there were seven of them:
 since 1918 in Warsaw,
 since 1919 in Poznań,
 since 1921 in Wilno and Gdańsk,
 since 1922 in Lwów and Lublin.

In the 1930s, the AZS had around 3 000 members, may of whom were renowned on the international stage. Among most famous AZS's sportspersons of the interbellum period, there were Halina Konopacka, Roger Verey, Jerzy Ustupski, Władysław Segda and Adam Papée. Most popular sports, practiced by members of the organization, were tourism, rowing, track and field, tennis, fencing and skiing.         
Quick growth of the organization made it necessary to create central office of the AZS, which would coordinate activities of all local branches. It was created on 18–19 March 1923 in Warsaw, during a meeting of all representatives. First director of the central office was Stefan Grodzki.

After World War II
As soon as the war was over, AZS recreated its activities, and its main office was moved to Kraków. New branches were opened in all academic centers of Poland. In 1945, AZS became active in colleges and universities in Katowice, Łódź, Gliwice, Wrocław and Częstochowa. Next branches were opened almost every year:
 1946 – Toruń, Szczecin,
 1949 – Zabrze-Rokitnica,
 1950 – Olsztyn, Białystok,
 1955 – Opole,
 1963 – Rzeszów,
 1965 – Bydgoszcz,
 1966 – Zielona Góra,
 1968 – Koszalin,
 1969 – Kielce, Płock, Radom, Siedlce, Słupsk,
1970s – Bielsko-Biała, Gorzów Wielkopolski, Cieszyn.

Currently
Academic Sports Association is currently the most popular students organization in Poland. According to its official webpage, it has 318 clubs, active at almost all Polish colleges and universities, both private and public. At one school, there can be only one AZS organization. As of 30 September 2007, it had more than 50 000 members. Its members have won numerous medals during the biggest sporting events in the world, including the Olympic Games. It has three sports centers – in Wilkasy, in Gorki Zachodnie near Gdańsk and in Zieleniec. It carries out activities in almost all kinds of sports.

Clubs
Sports teams, affiliated with AZS, used to compete in large numbers in top Polish leagues in such sports as volleyball and basketball.
Currently, in PlusLiga, there is one team affiliated with AZS:
 AZS Olsztyn

Olympic gold medallists from AZS
 Waldemar Baszanowski – AZS AWF Warszawa
 Leszek Blanik – AZS Gdańsk
 Ryszard Bosek – AZS Warszawa
 Marek Dąbrowski – AZS Warszawa
 Magdalena Fularczyk – AZS WSG Bydgoszcz
 Arkadiusz Godel – AZS Lublin
 Sylwia Gruchała – AZS Gdańsk
 Otylia Jędrzejczak – AZS AWF Warszawa
 Robert Korzeniowski – AZS AWF Katowice
 Tomasz Majewski – AZS AWF Warszawa
 Beata Mikołajczyk – AZS WSG Bydgoszcz
 Zbigniew Zarzycki – AZS AWF Warszawa
 Adrian Zieliński – AZS WSG Bydgoszcz
 Szymon Ziółkowski – AZS Poznań

External links
 Main page of the AZS organization

1909 establishments in Poland
Sports organizations established in 1909
Student sport in Poland
European members of the FISU
Sports governing bodies in Poland